Tom Rowland is an American politician who was the mayor of Cleveland, Tennessee. He was the longest-serving big city mayor in Tennessee history.

Rowland was elected in 1991 and served 26 years as mayor. During his tenure Cleveland's population grew from about 28,000 to 45,000. He retired from the position in 2017.

The Museum Center at Five Points and the Cleveland Regional Jetport were constructed during his tenure. Cleveland is the sixteenth-largest city in Tennessee and has the fifth-largest industrial economy in the state. Before becoming mayor, Rowland was a radio station owner and broadcast journalist.

References

Living people
People from Cleveland, Tennessee
21st-century American politicians
Mayors of places in Tennessee
Year of birth missing (living people)